"Somewhere Down the Barrel" is the debut single by Australian pop rock band The Dissociatives, from their album of the same name, released in 2004. It peaked at #25 on the Australian ARIA Charts.

The James Hackett directed music video won the ARIA Award for Best Video at the ARIA Music Awards of 2004.

Charts

References

2004 songs
2004 singles
The Dissociatives songs
Songs written by Daniel Johns
Songs written by Paul Mac